Daviesia retrorsa is a species of flowering plant in the family Fabaceae and is endemic to the south of Western Australia. It is a dense, tangled shrub with glabrous branchlets and leaves, scattered, needle-like, sharply pointed phyllodes turned backwards, and orange-yellow and red flowers.

Description

Taxonomy
Daviesia retrorsa was first formally described in 1995 by Michael Crisp in Australian Systematic Botany from specimens collected by Mark Clements, near the Balladonia-Esperance track in 1980. The specific epithet (retrorsa) means "pointing backwards, referring to the phyllodes".

Distribution and habitat
This daviesia grows in heath on dunes or rocky outcrops in near-coastal areas of southern Western Australia, east of Hopetoun in the Esperance Plains, Hampton and Mallee biogeographic regions of southern Western Australia.

Conservation status 
Daviesia retrorsa is listed as "not threatened" by the Government of Western Australia Department of Biodiversity, Conservation and Attractions.

References 

retrorsa
Taxa named by Michael Crisp
Plants described in 1995
Flora of Western Australia